The 1871 Birthday Honours were appointments by Queen Victoria to various orders and honours to reward and highlight good works by citizens of the British Empire. The appointments were made to celebrate the official birthday of the Queen, and were published in The London Gazette on 20 May 1871.

The recipients of honours are displayed here as they were styled before their new honour, and arranged by honour, with classes (Knight, Knight Grand Cross, etc.) and then divisions (Military, Civil, etc.) as appropriate.

United Kingdom and British Empire

The Most Honourable Order of the Bath

Knight Grand Cross of the Order of the Bath (GCB)

Military Division
Royal Navy
Admiral the Honourable Sir Henry Keppel 
Admiral Sir Alexander Milne 
Admiral Sir Sydney Colpoys Dacres 
General Sir Robert John Hussey Vivian 

Army
General Sir William Fenwick Williams 
Lieutenant-General Sir John Michel 
Lieutenant-General Lord William Paulet

Knight Commander of the Order of the Bath (KCB)

Military Division
Royal Navy
Rear-Admiral William Robert Mends 
Rear-Admiral William King-Hall 

Army
Lieutenant-General James Alexander 
Lieutenant-General Edward Walter Forestier-Walker 
Lieutenant-General John Fowler Bradford 
Major-General David Russell 
Major-General Henry William Stisted 
Major-General Charles Richard, Earl De La Warr 
Major-General Frederick Paul Haines
Major-General Thomas Montagu Steele 
Major-General Collingwood Dickson 
Major-General Charles Reid 
Major-General James William Fitzmayer 
Major-General Henry Charles Barnston Daubeney 
David Dumbreck  Inspector-General of Hospitals
Controller William Henry Drake

Companion of the Order of the Bath (CB)

Military Division
Royal Navy
Vice-Admiral Edward Gennys Fanshawe
Rear-Admiral John Bourmaster Dickson
Captain the Honourable George Disney Keane
Captain Alan Henry Gardner
Captain William Rae Rolland
Captain Edward Winterton Turnour
Captain Arthur William Acland Hood
Captain Charles Fellowes
Captain Charles Codrington Forsyth

Army
Colonel Edward Herbert Maxwell, 88th Regiment
Colonel Edward Kaye, Royal (late Bengal) Artillery
Colonel William Gordon
Colonel George Harry Smith Willis
Colonel Charles Vyvyan Cox, Royal (late Bengal) Artillery
Colonel George Wentworth Alexander Higginson, Grenadier Guards
Colonel William Boyle, 89th Regiment
Colonel Robert William Lowry, 47th Regiment
Colonel John Blick Spurgin  102nd Regiment
Colonel Robert John Eagar, 31st Regiment
Colonel the Honourable Hussey Fane Keane, Royal Engineers
Colonel Alexander Caesar Hawkins, Royal Artillery 
Colonel Richard Parke, Royal Marines
Colonel Fairfax Charles Hassard, Royal Engineers
Colonel George Shaw, Royal Artillery
Colonel John Chetham McLeod, 42nd Regiment
Colonel Sir Seymour John Blane  late Rifle Brigade
Colonel James Clerk Rattray, 90th Regiment
Colonel Thomas Wright, Bengal Staff Corps
Colonel Charles George Arbuthnot, Royal Artillery
Lieutenant-Colonel Howard Craufurd Elphinstone  (Civil) Royal Engineers
Lieutenant-Colonel Charles Henry Palliser, Bengal Staff Corps
Lieutenant-Colonel Walter Fane, Madras Staff Corps
Inspector-General of Hospitals Joshua Paynter
Deputy Inspector-General of Hospitals Richard James O'Flaherty
Surgeon-Major John Ashton Bostock  Scots Fusilier Guards

Civil Division
Controller William Henry Maturin
Colonel William Manley Hall Dixon, of the Royal Artillery, Superintendent of the Royal Small Arms Factory
Deputy Controller Ben Hay Martindale
Assistant Controller Joseph Osbertus Hamley

The Most Exalted Order of the Star of India

Knight Grand Commander (GCSI)
His Highness Dheraj Sumbho Sing, Maharana of Oodeypore
His Highness The Rao Pragmuljee of Cutch

Knight Commander (KCSI)
The Nawab Mohsin-ood-Dowlah Bahadoor of Oude
His Highness Mohubut Khan, Nawab of Joonaghur
Major-General George Inglis Jameson, Bombay Army, late President of the Military Finance Commission for India, Auditor of the Accounts of the Department of the Secretary of State for India in Council
John William Kaye, formerly of the Bengal Artillery, now Secretary in the Political and Secret Department of the Office of the Secretary of State for India in Council
Henry Sumner Maine, late Member of the Council of the Governor-General of India

Companion (CSI)

Khajah Abdool Gunny, of Dacca, late Member of the Council of the Lieutenant-Governor of Bengal for making Laws and Regulations
Vembankum Ramiergar, Member of the Council of the Governor of Madras for making Laws and Regulations
Istakant Shungoony Menon, Dewan of His Highness the Rajah of Cochin
Mir Shaharaut Ali, Superintendent of the State of Rutlam in Central India
Mahomed Akram Khan, Nawab of Amb
Sir Jamsetjee Jejeebhoy  late Member of the Council of the Governor of Bombay for making Laws and Regulations
Munguldass Nuthoobhoy, Member of the Council of the Governor of Bombay for making Laws and Regulations
Lionel Robert Ashburner, Bombay Civil Service, Collector and Magistrate of Kandeish
Major-General Alexander Cunningham, late Bengal Army, Director-General of the Archaeological Survey of India

References

Birthday Honours
1871 awards
1871 in India
1871 in the United Kingdom